VEB.RF, or VEB, is a Russian state development corporation. It was founded in 2007 as a development institute. VEB.RF is an investment company and development institute in Russia. It has financed more than 300 projects. The corporation's total assets were $50.3 billion, total liabilities were $45.2 billion, loan portfolio is $31.3 billion.

Activities
It's a non-political organisation. VEB.RF supports and develops the Russian economy. In partnership with commercial banks, it provides financing for large-scale projects to develop the country's infrastructure, industrial production and social sphere, strengthen its technological potential and improve the quality of life.

VEB.RF is validly existing under Russian law in the legal form of “non-profit organization”. It is not owned, nor directed by the government or political party.

On 22 February 2022, President Joe Biden announced that the US and its European allies will impose sanctions against the bank in response to the 2021–2022 Russo-Ukrainian crisis.

History

Vneshtorgbank (Foreign Trade Bank) of the USSR (1922–1988) 
18 August 1922, Swedish financier Olof Aschberg established the Soviet Union's first international bank, Roskombank ("Russian Commercial Bank") and its charter was approved by a Decree of the Council of Labor and Defense on 19 October 1922.

7 April 1924, the bank was renamed Vneshtorgbank ("Vneshtorgbank of the USSR" or "Foreign Trade Bank of the USSR"), a joint stock bank.

Vnesheconombank (Foreign Economic Affairs Bank) of the USSR 
In 1988, it was renamed Vnesheconombank of the USSR ("Bank for Foreign Economic Affairs of the USSR").

17 December 1991, Vnesheconombank accounts were frozen because of lack of funds.

For approximately seven years during the 1990s, the Kremlin's obshchak («общак») or black cash was stored in the vaults of Vnesheconombank (VEB) because Viktor Gerashchenko stated that in 1992 VEB became an agency for the return of the state debt of the USSR due to a decree by the Supreme Soviet: "Vnesheconombank does not have a central banking license. It does not need it, since it does not conduct any commercial operations." He also added, "Due to the lack of a license, this is the only Russian bank that the Central Bank does not check – it does not have the right."

In 2002, Vnesheconombank was restructured and it stepped up its efforts in servicing government programs, reduced the scope of its commercial business and gave a higher priority to supporting the government's structural reforms.

In April 2002, VEB was appointed Vnesheconombank agent for investing temporarily free Pension Fund's assets in securities denominated in foreign currency, and in January 2003, a special structural subdivision to handle pension funds was formed; VEB was appointed the "State Trust Management Company" responsible for investing Russia's pension funds.

From 2005 to 2006, both the assets and liabilities of the bank doubled from around $6 billion to $12 billion, and the income rose from $239 million to $301 million.

Bank of Development (2007–2018) 
In April 2007, Russia's State Duma passed the federal law "On Bank for Development," which regulated VEB's legal conditions and made it a state development bank.

Vladimir Putin increased lending when he became the VEB's chairman of its supervisory board in 2008. By late 2009, VEB quadrupled its assets to nearly 2 trillion rubles ($65 billion), it was seen by the government as an off-budget fund, used to put off budget expenses.

In July 2014, the United States Department of the Treasury imposed economic sanctions that greatly restricted U.S. persons and entities from providing doing business with VEB after the 2014 pro-Russian unrest in Ukraine. Between 2014 and 2017, the Russian Ministry of Finance spent $10 billion on the bank.

VEB has suffered massive losses in 2014–2015, leading to a 330 billion rubles government bailout in 2015, followed by 150 billion rubles in 2016 and a similar amount planned for 2017. VEB was the main lender for the 2014 Winter Olympics, and many of the loans originating from the games missed original returns forecasts, or had to be restructured.

In March 2016, the bank was promised a $2.2 billion bailout from the Russian government. Sergey Gorkov, a former senior executive at Sberbank, was appointed to lead VEB and come up with a turnaround strategy, which included the sale of non-core assets. The government originally offered the position to German Gref, who turned down the job.

In March 2017, Ukraine imposed sanctions on Vnesheconombank (and other Russian state-owned banks operating in Ukraine: Sberbank, VTB Bank, VS Bank, Prominvestbank, and BM Bank) as part of its continued sanctions on Russia for its annexation of Crimea and involvement in the War in Donbass.<ref name=63Ukraine2017>{{cite news | last = Пороше́нко | first = Петро́ Олексі́йович | author-link = Petro Poroshenko | title = УКАЗ ПРЕЗИДЕНТА УКРАЇНИ №63/2017: Про рішення Ради національної безпеки і оборони України від 15 березня 2017 року Про застосування персональних спеціальних економічних та інших обмежувальних заходів (санкцій)" | url = http://www.president.gov.ua/documents/632017-21474 | work = President of Ukraine website | language = uk | trans-title = DECREE OF THE PRESIDENT OF UKRAINE No. 63/2017: On the decision of the Council of National Security and Defense of Ukraine dated March 15, 2017 "On the Application of Personal Special Economic and Other Restrictive Measures (Sanctions)" | date = March 15, 2017 | access-date = February 28, 2018 | archive-date = March 1, 2018 | archive-url = https://web.archive.org/web/20180301104215/http://www.president.gov.ua/documents/632017-21474 | url-status = live }}</ref> After that, the bank tried to sell its Ukrainian subsidiary;  unsuccessfully. At Sochi in February 2018, Vnesheconombank's Sergey Gorkov said they hoped to sell its Ukrainian subsidiary, Prominvestbank, by May 2018.

In 2017, the bank's debt was $17 billion, including $14.2 billion in Ukraine. In January 2017, Gorkov released the bank's "Strategy 2021," which predicted relief from sanctions, resuming borrowing in the United States, and shifting risks to the government's budget. According to a report the New York Times'' published in May 2017, 40% of the bank's loans were at risk of default.

State Development Corporation (from 2018) 
In May 2018, Igor Shuvalov replaced Gorkov as VEB's new chairman. In July 2018, the bank requested a further $16 billion bailout from the Russian government. In October 2018 the bank announced plans to rebrand, changing its denomination into 'National Development Institute', and confirming it would be granted 600 billion rubles ($9.1 billion) in subsidies from the federal budget by 2024, in addition to the 125 billion rubles received in 2018.

The net profit for the 2018 amounted to 3.85 billion rubles after a loss to 200.4 billion rubles a year earlier. The net profit for the first quarter of 2019 17.6 billion rubles.

In 2019, after a long period when VEB.RF instead of financing new projects was engaged in servicing distressed assets, new investment projects appeared in the portfolio of the state corporation. In the framework of VEB.RF went into the development of the Udokan's copper deposit ($490 million), the production of sulfuric acid at the "KuibyshevAzot" and capacity expansion of "Shchekinoazot" for the production of methanol (the total participation of the corporation 8.5 billion.). VEB.RF started financing the project of construction of six large-tonnage vessels at the Zvezda super-shipyard near Vladivostok. Also VEB.RF, Gazprombank and Sberbank announced the funding of the development of the Talitsky area of the Verkhnekamsk potash deposit in Perm. VEB.RF and Sberbank will provide a syndicated loan for the modernization of Novaport group's regional airports in six cities of Russia, and together with Rockwell Capital will build the largest pulp and paper mill in Siberia.

Sanctions 
Sanctioned by New Zealand in relation to the 2022 Russian invasion of Ukraine.

In February 2022, due to Russia's invasion of Ukraine, together with its subsidiaries, it was included in the US sanctions list, SDN, which provides for the maximum possible restrictions and a complete freeze of assets. The bank was also disconnected from the SWIFT interbank payment system. Included in the sanctions list of Singapore.

Organisation
Chairman of VEB.RF is Igor Shuvalov (since May 2018). He was first deputy Prime Minister of the Russian Federation from 2008 to 2018. The highest governing body of VEB.RF is the Supervisory Board, it chaired by the Russian Prime Minister.

VEB.RF coordinates development institutions of Russia.

Ex-chairmans of Vnesheconombank: Tomas Alibegov - First Deputy Chairman and acting Chairman (1989–1997), Andrey Kostin (1996–2002), Vladimir Dmitriev (2004–2016), Sergei Gorkov (2016–2018).

See also

EXIAR

Notes

References

External links
Official homepage
VEB history website
Financial information

Banks of Russia
Companies based in Moscow
Russian state corporations
National development banks
Government-owned banks